Polydrusus tereticollis is a species of weevil native to Europe.

References

Curculionidae
Beetles described in 1775
Taxa named by Charles De Geer
Beetles of Europe